Chris Jaymes (born July 19, 1973) is an American television and film actor, director, screenwriter, producer, and musician.

Early life
Jaymes was born in Long Beach, California and spent his early years in Huntington Beach as an only child.  In his early teens, while working at a SCUBA shop as a Rescue Diver, he started having success as an amateur skateboarder which led him into the entertainment industry where he started working as an actor. He went on to attend Berklee College of Music studying piano and orchestration and toured with a number of artists, including Bootstraps and Wanda Jackson, as a piano player.

Career
Jaymes' entered the entertainment industry at the age of 17, getting a guest starring role in the hit show, Wings, which ended up getting cut out and rewritten prior to getting shot.  Shortly, thereafter, he was cast starring opposite Helen Hunt in the CBS movie-of-the-week Murder in New Hampshire: The Pamela Wojas Smart Story and he then went on to appear on a number of other television shows including Lost, Party of Five, Chicago Hope and numerous others. He played in a number of films as well including Ivan Reitman's Father's Day starring Robin Williams and Billy Crystal.

By 2000, he had directed a number of short films including The Reel and working as a script supervisor, editor and screenwriter until he starred and co-produced the feature film It's Alright Ma, I'm Only Trying. After which, he directed his first feature film In Memory of My Father where he starred alongside Jeremy Sisto and Judy Greer, as well as, produced, wrote, directed and edited the film which went onto receive critical acclaim and win a number of awards internationally, including the 2006 American Spirit/Best Feature Award at the Santa Barbara International Film Festival, the Grand Jury Award at CineVegas, Best Debut Feature at Sonoma Valley Film Festival and Best Director at the San Diego Film Festival.

Over the next years, Jaymes worked with numerous companies in development, including Signature Pictures, ghost writing on numerous films including The Black Dahlia and The Contractor, while also consulting through production and post.

In MySpace's heyday, Jaymes was hired as a content producer, to help stimulate and develop MySpace's homepage into a hub for video content, producing spots featuring artists and events, such as the Beastie Boys, Wyclef Jean, Colbie Caillat, Sundance, the Toronto International Film Festival, and many others. Concurrently, Jaymes produced and directed a number of commercials and web campaigns for companies such as Intel, Harper/Collins, Nikki Six, and LiveBooks.com, while also focusing his efforts on a myriad of Non-Profit Organizations, including One Generation and Island Dolphin Care.

Jaymes published a book, entitled Boxing Day about his experiences working in the 2004 tsunami disaster relief efforts

In 2010, Chris Jaymes co-wrote and directed Making A Scene starring William Shatner, Dave Foley, and Jason Priestley, a one-hour comedy for television, which led to a string of shows for the CBC including Long Story Short a scripted comedy with Martin Short starring Robin Duke, Anne Murray, and Norman Jewison, and two pilots, including Late Night with Lang & O'Leary, and an entertainment news show, The Feed.

In 2011, he directed the feature-length thriller, The Cottage starring David Arquette, Kristen Dalton, and Lorraine Nicholson, while also working with Levendis Entertainment and Nick Lambrou, developing the screenplay for the feature film action epic, Sons of Chaos, surrounding the Greek War for Independence.

In 2012, Jaymes was brought on as a producer for a Travel Channel show starring David Arquette, while also directing a series for FOX/Netflix entitled Bad Samaritans with Andy Dick and Julianna Guill.

Beginning in 2012, Jaymes began working with the non-profit organization Island Dolphin Care, a facility where children with brain disorders and war veterans with PTSD, receive progressive therapy treatments working alongside bottlenose dolphins. His research and footage of IDC dolphins combined with news anchor Kerry Sanders’ (NBC) reporting, won the 2014 Michael Debakey Journalism Award, recognizing outstanding journalism that highlights the role of biomedical research that includes the humane and responsible use of animal models in recent medical discoveries and scientific breakthroughs. The story was about a dolphin named Sara who underwent an expansion of a somewhat collapsed airway; a procedure carried out by a group of specialists from across the country, that had never before executed on a dolphin and the surgery was a success.

During this period, Jaymes also worked closely with Jordan Beckett on various writing projects and participated as the piano player in the band Bootstraps, which was signed briefly to Capitol Records Harvest Label. Jaymes toured with the band in 2013 and is featured on the 2014 Live at Pulse Studios videos and recordings playing piano and keyboards on the tracks "Haywire", "Oh, Ca", "Sleeping Giants" and "Guiltfree". That same year, Bootstraps songs were featured in numerous films and shows, including the band's remake of Whitney Houston's "I Wanna Dance With Somebody" which was featured in Grey's Anatomy, Supergirl, and in ads for the Venice Film Festival.

Jaymes's screenplay Unconditional based on Joe Hoagland and the story that inspired the inception of Island Dolphin Care was recognized as a 2016 Semi-Finalist in the Academy of Motion Picture Arts & Sciences Nicholl Fellowship.

In 2018, Jaymes directed Cartel Pictures thriller Their Killer Affair for Lifetime starring Melissa Archer produced by Eric Scott Woods and Stan Spry. In 2021, Jaymes teamed up with Cartel Pictures to direct another thriller for Lifetime (TV network) entitled Recipe for Abduction and again in 2022 for Dancer in Danger.

In 2019, after eight years of development, Sons of Chaos, a historical fictionalized retelling of the Greek Revolution of 1821 was published globally as a hardbound, 192 page, oversized graphic novel, by IDW and Penguin Random House. Jaymes wrote and created the book with Ale Aragon doing the artwork.

During the pandemic years, 2020 and 2021 Jaymes was amongst the first 20 volunteers to join Sean Penn's non-profit CORE - Community Organized Relief Effort, working to create the solutions that would become the backbone for the implementation and management of Covid-19 test sites, and eventually vaccination sites across the country.

In 2021, the release of the Greek Edition, entitled 1821:Children of the Revolution was published by Kaktos Publishing throughout all Greek territories and Cyprus.

In 2022, Jaymes returned as an actor in the CBS reboot of Magnum P.I. (2018 TV series) as Bryan, a recovered alcoholic trying to make his life right, as well as, starring in Constellations the award-winning two-hander play by British playwright Nick Payne directed by Kevin Keaveney.

In December 2022, Jaymes was honored by the Parnassos Literary Society, the oldest literary society in Greece founded in 1865, with a Medal of Freedom, for his efforts to keep the 'spirit of Greek values alive'.

In 2023, Chris Jaymes portrays English Astronaut Nick Jennings on season 4 of the Apple+ show For All Mankind (TV series).

Film, Television & Books

Television
For All Mankind (TV series) (Season 4, 2023) – actor
Magnum P.I. (1 episode, 2022) Sleep With the Fishes – actor
The Millionaire (1 episode, 2013) – director
Bad Samaritans (1 episode, 2012) – director
 Mile High (pilot) (1 episode, 2012) – producer
 Long Story Short (1 episode, 2011) – director
 Late Night With Lang & O'Leary (1 episode, 2011) – director, producer
 The Feed (Canadian TV series) (1 episode, 2011) – director, producer
 Making a Scene (1 episode, 2010) – writer/director
Lost (episode "LaFleur", 2009) – actor
The Fugitive (1 episode, 2000) – actor
Chicago Hope (1 episode, 1999) – actor
NYPD Blue (1 episode, 1999) – actor
Vengeance Unlimited (1 episode, 1998) -actor
Profiler (1 episode, 1998 – actor
Party of Five (2 episodes, 1996–1997) – actor
Touched by an Angel (1 episode, 1997) – actor
Murder in New Hampshire: The Pamela Wojas Smart Story – actor (1991)
The Fresh Prince of Bel-Air (1 episode, 1990)

Film
 Salt the Earth (2022) - Actor
 Dancer in Danger (2022) – Director
 Recipe for Abduction (2021) – Director
 Their Killer Affair (2020) – Director
 The Cottage (2012) – Director, editor
 Misfits (2011) – Actor
 Shrink Me (2010) – Writer, director
 Bhutto (2010) – Cinematography
 Beyond the Mat (2010) – Editor
 In Memory of My Father (2008) – writer, director, producer, editor, actor
 It's Alright Ma, I'm Only Trying (2000) – producer, actor
 Max, 13 (1999) – actor
 Verses (1999) – actor, editor
 The Reel (1999) – writer, director, actor
 Little Savant (1999) – actor
 Some Girl (1998) – actor
 Father's Day (1997) – actor
 Dogs of Wood's Hole (1997) – actor

Theater
Constellations (play) - Lead Actor/Role: Roland - 2022 Hawaiian Premiere - KOA Theater
Butterflies Are Free (play) - Lead Actor: Role: Don Baker - Matrix Theater, Los AngelesCurtains - Lead Actor/Role: Michael - International City Theater, Long BeachThree Sisters (play) - Lead Actor/Role: Vershinin - South Coast Repertory ConservatoryMeasure For Measure - Lead Actor/Role: Claudio - South Coast Repertory ConservatoryFloating Rhoda & the Glue Man - Lead Actor - L.A.C.E Theater, Los Angeles

Books1821: Ta Paidia tis Epanastasis (Children of the Revolution)(2021) - Kaktos PublishingSons of Chaos (2019) - a graphic novel - Penguin Random House & IDW Publishing (2019)Boxing Day (2007) - Bangkok Books, Books Mango

Awards & Nominations
AwardsSons of Chaos - Book, Graphic Novel
 2022 Medal of Freedom | Parnassos Literary Society - Athens, GreeceUnconditional - Screenplay
2016 Academy of Motion Picture Arts & Sciences – Nicholl Fellowship Semi-FinalistIn Memory of My Father2006 Santa Barbara International Film Festival – Best American Film/American Spirit Award
2006 Sonoma Valley Film Festival – Best Debut Feature
2006 Santa Cruz Film Festival – Director's Award
2005 CineVegas – Grand Jury Award
2005 San Diego Film Festival – Best Director
2005 AOF FEST – Best Picture
2005 Ft. Lauderdale International Film Festival – Spirit Award
2006 Lake Forest Film Fest – Grand Jury Award

NominationsIn Memory of My Father''
2006 Atlanta Film Festival – Best Actor
2006 Marbella International Film Festival – Best Film
2005 NatFilm Copenhagen – Best Feature
2005 Starz Denver Int. Film Fest – Director to Watch – Chris Jaymes

References

External links

Official website #1
Official website #2:archive
Chris Jaymes on the Super Hero Speak podcast from NYCC

1973 births
Living people
American rock pianists
American male screenwriters
American male film actors
Film producers from California
American male television actors
Male actors from Long Beach, California
Writers from Long Beach, California
Film directors from California
Screenwriters from California